USS Ono (SP-128) was an armed motorboat that served in the United States Navy as a patrol vessel from 1917 to 1919.
 
Ono was built as a civilian motorboat in 1908 by Seymour at Detroit, Michigan. The U.S. Navy took control of Ono from her owner, William Reed-Hill of Detroit, on 16 June 1917 for use as a patrol boat during World War I. She was commissioned the same day as USS Ono (SP-128). The Navy formally purchased Ono from Reed-Hill on 2 July 1917

Ono was assigned to the 10th Naval District, and patrolled the waters of the Great Lakes for the remainder of the war.

Ono was stricken from the Navy List on 12 August 1919 and sold to Harry M. Coomer on 20 November 1919.

Notes

References

Department of the Navy Naval Historical Center Online Library of Selected Images: Civilian Ships: Ono (American Motor Boat, 1908). Served as USS Ono (SP-128) in 1917-1919
NavSource Online: Section Patrol Craft Photo Archive: Ono (SP 128)

Patrol vessels of the United States Navy
World War I patrol vessels of the United States
Ships built in Detroit
1908 ships
Great Lakes ships